The men's 10,000 metres event at the 2017 Summer Universiade was held on 24 August at the Taipei Municipal Stadium.

Results

References

10000